Kutubpur Datana ( known as Datana ) is a village of 

Situation
The village of Datana comes under the Budhana Tehsil. The Hindon River touches the border of the village in the North.

There is one primary school and one school just behind it up to 8th class. Shivji Temple is situated beside the primary school. 

Agriculture land is mainly divided into two geographical units, Khadar and Bangar, nearer to and farther from river respectively. Although sugarcane is the main commercial crop, peoples also plant poplar trees in abundance.

Villages near Datana are Atali and Nagwa to the east, Mahaljana to the west and Riyawali and Nagla to the north.
Buses, jugar, tanga (horse-cart) and e-rikshaw (Electric Rickshaw) are the main transportation means. To reach the village from Delhi, there are bus routes via Baraut and Meerut.  

Nature of Peoples

People of this village are too familiar and helpful to others, they love to visit Budhana market for shopping, they also love to watch cinema on theatre.

References

Cities and towns in Muzaffarnagar district